

This is a list of the National Register of Historic Places listings in Montgomery County, Pennsylvania.

This is intended to be a complete list of the properties and districts on National Register of Historic Places in Montgomery County, Pennsylvania, United States.

There are 159 properties and districts listed on the National Register in the county. Eleven sites are further designated National Historic Landmarks and one is designated a National Historical Park.  Another three properties were once listed but have been removed.

Current listings

|}

Former listings

|}

See also

 List of National Historic Landmarks in Pennsylvania
 National Register of Historic Places listings in Pennsylvania
 List of Pennsylvania state historical markers in Montgomery County

References

Montgomery County
History of Montgomery County, Pennsylvania